The Nebraska Forest Service is the state forestry agency for the state of Nebraska. The Nebraska Forest Service serves the citizens on Nebraska by operating with the mission to provide services and education to the people of Nebraska for the protection, utilization and enhancement of the State's tree, forest and other natural resources. Headquartered in Lincoln, Nebraska, the Nebraska Forest Service is embedded within the Institution of Agriculture and Natural Resources at the University of Nebraska-Lincoln.

District Offices
Chadron, Nebraska - Northwest District, 430 E. 2nd St., Chadron, NE 69337
Ord, Nebraska - North Central District, Box 210 Hadar Industrial Park, Hwy. 11, Ord, NE 68862
Norfolk, Nebraska - Northeast District
North Platte, Nebraska - Southwest District, 461 University Drive, North Platte, NE 69101
Clay Center, Nebraska - South Central District, Box 66 Clay Center, NE 68933-0066 
Lincoln, Nebraska - Southeast District and Headquarters, 102 Forestry Hall, Lincoln, NE 68583-0815

Program Areas
Program areas within the agency include Rural Forestry, Community Forestry and Sustainable Landscapes, Forest Health, Wildland Fire Protection, and Marketing and Utilization.

Rural Forestry
The Rural Forestry program of the Nebraska Forest Services provides key services such as technical assistance for forest management, tree planting, insect and disease problems, timber harvest, fuels reduction and other forestry issues, developing forest management plans for individual landowners, financial cost-share assistance, landowner education and training, and linking landowners to forest product markets for enhanced rural economies.

Community Forestry and Sustainable Landscapes
Nebraska's community forests are an important component of the State's forest resources. With community forests currently on the decline around the state, the Community Forestry and Sustainable Landscapes program has an important role within the Nebraska Forest Service and Nebraska.

The Community Forestry and Sustainable Landscapes program provides many key services to the communities of Nebraska. These services include cost-share assistance for community forest and landscape design, installation and management, network development for statewide arboretums and Tree City USA communities, training and professional development for landscape managers and green industry professionals, disaster "releaf" assistance for impacted communities, pest identification, monitoring and control recommendations, as well as development and support for statewide initiatives such as ReTree Nebraska, GreatPlants Program, conservation education and Nebraska Community Forestry Council.

The Community Forestry and Sustainable Landscapes also administers the programs for the Nebraska Statewide Arboretum Inc.

Forest Health
The Forest Health program of the Nebraska Forest Service provides services such as training in tree pest diagnosis and control for arborists and green
industry professionals, technical assistance to landowners, agencies and businesses, tree and forest pest diagnoses and monitoring, statewide pest surveys and research, and pest management and control recommendations. Examples of emerging forest pests and diseases of interest to Nebraska are Emerald Ash Borer, Thousand cankers disease of Black Walnut, Pine wilt, Asian Longhorned Beetle, and Mountain Pine Beetle.

Wildland Fire Protection
Nebraska faces may challenges from wildland fire throughout the state. From the Pine Ridge forests of the western Panhandle that consist of Ponderosa Pine with tallgrass prairie understory to the Eastern redcedar infested riparian Eastern Cottonwood forests of the Platte River corridor in the center of the state and the Niobrara River valley in the Northeast, wildland fire is an annual threat to Nebraska's forest resources and communities.
The Wildland Fire Protection program provides services to the state to help prevent and protect against wildland fire. These services include wildfire prevention and suppression technical assistance to rural fire districts statewide, wildland fire suppression training and certification for rural firefighters and state and federal agency employees, wildfire prevention programming and material development, organization of citizen-based fire prevention education groups, assisting fire districts in fire planning, assisting mutual aid districts in developing mutual aid directories, securing and reconditioning excess military vehicles for rural fire departments, providing cost-share assistance to purchase equipment and increase firefighter safety and reducing wildfire risk to homeowners and communities through forest fuels management.

Forest Fuels Reduction
Thinning forests to lower fuels loads is the only effective way to reduce extreme wildfire behavior. The Nebraska Forest Service Forest Fuels
Reduction Program creates strategically located corridors of thinned forests across the landscape, reduces fire intensity, improves fire suppression effectiveness, increases firefighter safety, and better protects lives and property.

Marketing and Utilization
The Marketing and Utilization program of the Nebraska Forest Service is responsible for managing and promoting forestry products around the state, such as hybrid hazelnuts and woody biomass.

Hybrid Hazelnut Commercialization
The goal of this project is to accelerate commercial development of the hybrid hazelnut as a profitable, environmentally friendly food and bioenergy crop for producers in Nebraska and the central United States. Commercially available hazelnuts, or filberts, are currently produced only in Oregon from the European hazelnut. This plant is not productive elsewhere in the U.S. due to disease susceptibility and lack of cold hardiness. After nearly a century of breeding, cold-hardy, disease-resistant hybrids that produce commercial quantities of high-quality nuts in Nebraska are now available. A consortium of the Nebraska Forest Service (at the University of Nebraska), Oregon State University, National Arbor Day Foundation and Rutgers University is leading the effort nationally to commercialize this new "third" crop.

Woody Biomass Utilization
Woody biomass is a carbon-neutral, clean burning, renewable energy resource that can help solve these problems. Nebraska-grown wood is an underutilized, plentiful, economic energy resource that can revitalize our rural economies. To achieve this, financial support from the government is
needed.
The focus of woody biomass utilization in the state is reducing Nebraska's energy dependence on fossil fuels, creating jobs and new sources of income in depressed rural areas, reducing forest fuel loads and risk of catastrophic wildfires, creating markets for eastern redcedar cleared from grazing lands, addressing scarce water issues in drought-stressed watersheds through forest management and creating more productive, healthier forests and revitalized rural communities.

References

External links
Official website
Nebraska Statewide Arboretum

State agencies of Nebraska
State forestry agencies in the United States